The women's 4 x 400 metres relay at the 2009 World Championships in Athletics was held at the Olympic Stadium on August 22 and August 23.

Medalists

* Runners who participated in the heats only and received medals.

**Original medalists Russia forfeited results and medals as a result of disqualification of Kapachinskaya.

Records

Prior to the competition, the following records were as follows.

No new world or championship record was set during this competition.

Qualification standards

Schedule

Results

Heats

Qualification: First 3 of each heat (Q) plus the 2 fastest times (q) advance to the final.

Key:  DQ = Disqualified, Q = qualification by place in heat, q = qualification by overall place, SB = Seasonal best

Final

Key:  SB = Seasonal best, WL = World leading (in a given season)

References

External links
Women's 4 x 400 metres relay qualification from IAAF (Archived 2009-09-08). IAAF. Retrieved on 2009-08-27.
Women's 4 x 400 metres relay final results from IAAF. IAAF. Retrieved on 2009-08-27.

4x400
Relays at the World Athletics Championships
2009 in women's athletics